Fortuna (minor planet designation: 19 Fortuna) is one of the largest main-belt asteroids. It has a composition similar to 1 Ceres: a darkly colored surface that is heavily space-weathered with the composition of primitive organic compounds, including tholins.

Fortuna is 225 km in diameter and has one of the darkest known geometric albedos for an asteroid over 150 km in diameter.  Its albedo has been measured at 0.028 and 0.037. The spectra of the asteroid displays evidence of aqueous alteration.

The Hubble Space Telescope observed Fortuna in 1993. It was resolved with an apparent diameter of 0.20 arcseconds (4.5 pixels in the Planetary Camera) and its shape was found to be nearly spherical. Satellites were searched for but none were detected.

Stellar occultations by Fortuna have been observed several times. Fortuna has been studied by radar.

It was discovered by J. R. Hind on August 22, 1852, and named after Fortuna, the Roman goddess of luck.

Fortuna has been perturbed by the 80 km 135 Hertha and was initially estimated by Baer to have a mass of 1.08 kg. A more recent estimate by Baer suggests it has a mass of 1.27 kg.

On December 21, 2012, Fortuna (~200 km) harmlessly passed within 6.5 Gm of asteroid 687 Tinette.

References

External links
 
 

Background asteroids
Fortuna
Fortuna
G-type asteroids (Tholen)
Ch-type asteroids (SMASS)
18520822